Inverlaw is a rural locality in the South Burnett Region, Queensland, Australia.

History 
Four Mile Gully Provisional School opened on 12 November 1907; it was built by Messrs Knudsen and Kirchheim at a cost of £99. On 1 January 1909, it became Four Mile Gully State School. On 17 September 1912, it was renamed Inverlaw State School. It closed on 24 May 1968. It was at 168 Wooden Hut Road (corner of Inverlaw School Road).

In 1910, an organisation of local farmers called the Four Mile Gully Association was formed. In 1918, it decided that the public hall was needed. In 1920, pioneer R.J. Crawford donated two acres of land for the hall. The Inverlaw Farmers Hall was opened in 1921. Its centenary was celebrated on Saturday 19 June 2021.

A stump-capping ceremony was held for the Inverlaw Methodist Church on Thursday 29 March 1917. The church was completed later that year. It could seat 120 people and was built at a cost of £230.

Education 
There are no schools in Inverlaw. The nearest government primary schools are Taabinga State School and Kingaroy State School, both in neighbouring neighbouring Kingaroy to the east and north-east respectively. The nearest government secondary school is Kingaroy State High School in Kingaroy.

Amenities 
Inverlaw Farmer Hall is on Kingaroy Burrandowan Road.

References 

South Burnett Region
Localities in Queensland